The mythology of the Miwok Native Americans are myths of their world order, their creation stories and 'how things came to be' created. Miwok myths suggest their spiritual and philosophical world view. In several different creation stories collected from Miwok people, Coyote was seen as their ancestor and creator god, sometimes with the help of other animals, forming the earth and making people out  of humble materials like feathers or twigs.

According to Miwok mythology, the people believed in animal and human spirits, and spoke of animal spirits as their ancestors. Coyote in many tales figures as their ancestor, creator god, and a trickster god. The Miwok mythology is similar to other Native American myths of Northern California.

Creation of the world

First people

The Miwok believed there existed a "people who lived before real people" who in some tales have died out, in others are the same as the supernatural animal spirits.

Several creation fragments exist detailing Coyote's place in the family of the "first spirits" on earth. According to the Coast Miwok, Coyote was the declared grandfather of the Falcon. There existed animal spirits and a few star-people spirits. From the Sacramento river area the Miwok gave the following names of the first spirits:

 O-let'-te Coyote-man, the Creator
 Mol'-luk the Condor, father of Wek'-wek
 Wek'-wek the Falcon, son of Mol'-luk and grandson of O-let'-te
 Hul'-luk mi-yum'-ko the two beautiful women chiefs of the Star-people
 Os-so-so'-li Pleiades, one of the Star-women
 Ke'-lok the North Giant
 Hoo-soo'-pe the Mermaids or Water-maidens, sisters of Wek'-wek
 Choo'-hoo the Turkey Buzzard
 Kok'-kol the Raven
 Ah-wet'-che the Crow
 Koo-loo'-loo the Humming-bird

Coast Miwok (Coyote and Walik) 
According to one Coast Miwok version "Coyote shook his walik" (something similar to a blanket of tule) to the four directions south, east, north and west. The water dried, and land appeared.

The Diver
In one creation myth called The Diver Coyote creates the earth and land from the Ocean or endless water. Coyote sends a turtle to dive into the Ocean for some "earth". The turtle dives to the bottom and comes up with some "earth". Coyote takes the earth and mixes it with "Chanit" seeds and water. The mixture swells and "the earth was there."

Coyote and Silver Fox
Another creation story says that there is "no earth, only water". Silver Fox (a vixen) feels lonely and mentions this in a prayer song, and then meets the Coyote. Silver Fox makes an artistic proposal: "We will sing the world". They create the world together by dancing and singing. As they do so, the earth forms and takes shape.

Creation of humankind

Coast Miwok (Coyote and Turkey Buzzard)
In The Creation of Humans myth, Coyote catches a turkey buzzard, raven and crow, plucks their feathers and place the feathers in different parts of the earth. They turn into the Miwok people and their villages.

Coast Miwok (Coyote and Chicken Hawk)
Coyote comes from the west alone, followed by Chicken Hawk, who is his grandson. Coyote turned "his first people" into animals. He made the Pomo people from mud and the Miwok people out of sticks.

Sierra Miwok (how ravens became people)
In the myth How Kah'-kah-loo The Ravens Became People, there was an epic flood,  and the first world people climbed a mountain to avoid drowning. The water finally receded. They were starving, they thought it was safe to come down and look for food but they sank into the mud and died. The ravens came to sit on the holes where the people died, one raven at each hole. The ravens turned into new people the Miwok.

Sierra Miwok (Coyote and Lizard) 
From the Sierra Miwoks, another creation myth is more comparable to Pomo mythology: Coyote and Lizard create the world "and everything in it". Coyote create human beings from some twigs. They argue over whether human beings should have hands. Lizard wants humans to have hands but Coyote does not. Lizard wins a scuffle, and humans are created with hands.

Death and afterlife stories

Coast Miwok (Ocean Path West) 
According to Coast Miwok, the dead jumped into the ocean at Point Reyes and followed something like a string leading west beyond the breaker waves, that took them to the setting sun. There they remained with Coyote in an afterworld "ute-yomigo" or "ute-yomi", meaning "dead home."

Context
Many of the ideas, plots and characters in Miwok mythology are shared with neighboring people of Northern California. For example, the Coyote-lizard story is like the tale told by their neighbors, the Pomo people. In addition, the Ohlone also believed that Coyote was the grandfather of the Falcon and maker of mankind. The relationship and similarity to Yokuts traditional narratives is also evident.

The myths of creation after an epic flood or ocean, the Earth Diver, and the Coyote as ancestor and trickster compare to Central and Northern California mythemes of Yokuts mythology, Ohlone mythology and Pomo mythology. The myths of "First People" dying out to be replaced with the Miwok people is a "deeply impressed conception" shared by Natives in Northwestern California.

See also
Miwok traditional narrative

Notes

References 

Barrett, Samuel A. "Myths of the Southern Sierra Miwok", University of California Publications in American Archaeology and Ethnology, March 23, 1927, Vol. 16, pages 1–28.
Bruchac, Joseph, editor. "Silver Fox and Coyote Create Earth", Native American Animal Stories, edited by Joseph Bruchac (Fulcrum Pub.: Golden, CO, 1992), 3–4.
 Kelly, Isabel. 1978. "Coast Miwok", in Handbook of North American Indians, vol. 8 (California). William C. Sturtevant, and Robert F. Heizer, eds. Washington, DC: Smithsonian Institution, 1978.  / 0160045754, (Religion and ritual, page 423. mythology informants: Tom Smith and Maria Copa Frias).
Kroeber, Alfred L. 1907. "Indian Myths of South Central California". University of California Publications in American Archaeology and Ethnology 4:203. Berkeley. (Southern Sierra Miwok myths: Earth Diver, p. 203.); available at Sacred texts Online and  3Rocks Publications
Kroeber, Alfred L. 1907. The Religion of the Indians of California, University of California Publications in American Archaeology and Ethnology 4:#6. Berkeley, sections titled "Shamanism", "Public Ceremonies", "Ceremonial Structures and Paraphernalia", and "Mythology and Beliefs"; available at Sacred Texts Online
 Kroeber, Alfred L. 1925. Handbook of the Indians of California. Washington, D.C: Bureau of American Ethnology Bulletin No. 78. (Chapter 30, The Miwok); available at Yosemite Online Library
Gifford, Edward W., editor. Miwok Myths, Published by University of California Publications in American Archaeology and Ethnicity, May 11, 1917, Vol. 12, No. 3, pages 283–338. (Fourteen versions, including Theft of Fire and Bear and Fawns, collected in 1913-1914 from Central Sierra informants William Fuller and Thomas Williams.); available at Sacred Texts Online
Merriam, C. Hart, editor.The Dawn of the World, Myths and Weird Tales Told by the Mewan (Miwok) Indians of California. Cleveland OH: Arthur H. Clarke Co, 1910. Reprinted as The Dawn of the World: Myths and Tales of the Miwok Indians of California, in 1993 with an introduction by Lowell J. Bean, University of Nebraska Press, Lincoln; available at Sacred Texts Online

Miwok
Native American mythology of California
Traditional narratives (Native California)
History of the San Francisco Bay Area
History of the Sierra Nevada (United States)